David Bowdich  is an American law enforcement officer who served as the Deputy Director of the Federal Bureau of Investigation. Prior to that post, Bowdich served as the Associate Deputy Director of the Federal Bureau of Investigation from April 2016 to April 2018, while serving as the Acting Deputy Director from January 29, 2018 until his promotion on April 13, 2018.

Early life and education 
Bowdich was born and raised in Albuquerque, New Mexico. His father, Joe Bowdich, served with the Albuquerque Police Department for 30 years and was the sheriff of Bernalillo County for seven years. Bowdich's grandfather was a deputy chief for the Albuquerque Fire Department.

Bowdich attended high school at Temple Baptist Academy, graduating in 1987.

Bowdich earned a Bachelor of Science in criminal justice from New Mexico State University in 1991. He later received a master's degree in leadership from the McDonough School of Business at Georgetown University.

Career 
Bowdich was a police officer with the Albuquerque Police Department from 1991 to 1995, where he patrolled the Southeast and North Valley area commands and served as a detective in the North Valley.

Bowdich joined the Federal Bureau of Investigation in 1995 in San Diego, California field office, where he served as a SWAT team member and investigated violent crimes and gangs. Bowdich managed an investigation that resulted in convictions against street gang members in the United States District Court for the Southern District of California.

Bowdich received a promotion to the headquarters of the Federal Bureau of Investigation in 2003, serving in the Safe Streets and Gang Unit. After two years at headquarters, Bowdich transferred to supervising a multi-agency gang task force in San Diego. Bowdich managed agents investigating drug cases and racketeering cases against the Mexican Mafia, Bloods, Crips, and Hells Angels.

In 2009, Bowdich became in charge of the field office in San Diego. Bowdich noticed that there was a trend of kidnapping committed by Mexican cartel-related criminal enterprises, so he initiated an interagency squad that built a large-scale criminal case against 43 members and associates of the cartel who were kidnapping individuals in and around San Diego. Bowdich also supervised the investigations into the murders of two United States Border Patrol agents.

By 2011, Bowdich was the Federal Bureau of Investigation supervisor in San Diego, managing 100 agents and officers around Mexico–United States border.

In 2012, Bowdich was promoted to special agent in charge of the Counterterrorism Division at the Federal Bureau of Investigation's office in Los Angeles and overseas investigations in Southeast Asia. That year, he oversaw an investigation and arrest of four individuals involved in a terrorism plot. The four individuals were arrested and charged with conspiring to provide material support to terrorists in preparation for or in carrying out acts of terrorism. In 2013, Bowdich was part of a team of people from the Federal Bureau of Investigation that traveled to Dhaka, Bangladesh, to meet with Bangladeshi Minister of Home Affairs Muhiuddin Khan Alamgir and to Inspector General of Police Hassan Mahmood Khandaker to discuss the proliferation of militancy and how to increase law enforcement officers' effectiveness through training.

In 2014, Bowdich was promoted to Assistant Director in Charge (ADIC) of the Los Angeles office. He was responsible for the Federal Bureau of Investigation's response to the San Bernardino attack in 2015.

After Andrew McCabe went on leave on January 29, 2018, prior to his dismissal from the FBI, Bowdich, as Associate Deputy Director, assumed his position.

Bowdich was formally appointed Deputy Director on April 13, 2018, by Director Christopher A. Wray. Bowdich fired Agent Peter Strzok on August 10, 2018.

In 2020, regarding cyberwarfare by Russia, Bowdich stated that “Time and again, Russia has made it clear: They will not abide by accepted norms, and instead, they intend to continue their destructive, destabilizing cyber behavior.”

References

External links 
 David Bowdich at FBI.gov

Living people
American police officers
Deputy Directors of the Federal Bureau of Investigation
New Mexico State University alumni
McDonough School of Business alumni
Trump administration personnel
Year of birth missing (living people)